Barton McLean (born 8 April 1938) is an American composer, performer, music reviewer, and writer.

Life
Barton McLean was born in Poughkeepsie, New York, the son of John and Grace McLean, on April 8, 1938. He graduated from State University of New York (SUNY) Potsdam (BS 1960), Eastman School of Music (MM 1965), where he was a student of Henry Cowell, and Indiana University (DMA 1972). He taught music theory and double bass at SUNY (1960–66), while performing on double bass in jazz groups and the Hudson Valley Philharmonic Orchestra. From 1969–76 he taught music composition and theory at Indiana University South Bend. From 1969–76 he directed the Electronic Music Center at the University of Texas at Austin. In 1967 he married fellow composer Priscilla Taylor, and by 1974 they began professional touring as The McLean Mix, presenting their electro-acoustic music, which became a full-time occupation by 1983.

He created a series of solo instrument and stereo tape pieces, best known of which is Dimensions II (1974), championed by pianist David Burge, who performed it extensively for several years. Another extensively performed set in this series, Dimensions III and IV for saxophone and stereo tape (1979)  was premiered by Albert Regni in concert at the University of Texas at Austin on November 15, 1979, and recorded by Regni on CRI Records in 1980, and is still actively performed today.

Created with a National Endowment for the Arts Composer Grant, McLean's Song of the Nahuatl, an electronic composition for eight channels of sound, was premiered at the University of Miami on March 24, 1978. The Electric Sinfonia, an electronic work which uses a 16-tone octave scale, won an award at the International Bourges, France Electro-acoustic Music Festival in June 1983. Along with many electronic works composed over the years, Barton McLean also developed the concept of the audience interacting intricately with instruments and live electronics in several installations.

McLean's music is often based upon processes and sounds of the natural world, while using current electronic and recording technology. The result is considered to have both primitive and sophisticated elements.  Barton McLean's signature work is the audience-interactive installation RAINFOREST created in collaboration with wife and composer Priscilla McLean. It was staged and performed extensively throughout the USA, Canada, Europe, UK, Australia, New Zealand, and Southeast Asia from 1989 until 2013. In a darkened room a taped drone of recorded and synthesizer sounds and continuous projections of rainforest images provided an atmosphere in which members of the public were invited to perform vocally with microphones and on electronic and acoustic instruments.

In 1994, McLean was awarded a New York State Council for the Arts grant to create an installation with a nostalgic Ray Bradbury feel, portraying the ancestors of the tiny village of Petersburgh, New York. Using blown-up photographs and stations set up with recorded speaking voices, instruments, and electronic sounds, Forgotten Shadows was premiered in the Veterans Memorial Hall, Petersburgh, on Oct. 14, 1994. The music was made into a recording that is unique to McLean's style. A new direction in McLean's composing using a computer program written in Cycling '74 software Max/MSP allowed for the creation of Magic at Xanadu (MAX), inspired by the Coleridge poem "Kubla Khan" and performed live on keyboards and computer by Barton McLean. Magic at Xanadu (MAX) was recorded at the Knickerbocker Theatre in Holland, Michigan in 2008 and became a feature of The McLean Mix tours through 2010. Currently, McLean is composing with and developing concepts on the Kyma system provided by Symbolic Sound.
 
The McLean Mix performed from 1974 to 2013, presenting their separate works and collaborations across the USA and internationally; in these concerts he played the piano or synthesizer, plus woodwinds, amplified bicycle wheel, invented instruments, percussion, and digital processors.
The McLeans live in Petersburgh, New York.

Awards

 1975–95 fifty five Meet the Composer Grants from MTC New York, New England, Midwest, Mid-America, Texas, West, and California during McLean Mix touring
 1976 National Endowment for the Arts Media Arts Grant
 1981 Dimensions III chosen as the American representative of the UNESCO-International Music Council-Rostrum International Festival
 1976, 1982 National Endowment for the Arts Composer Fellowships
 1979, 1981, 1983, 1985, 2002 MacDowell Colony Fellowships 
 1983 The Electric Sinfonia awarded prize at International Bourges, France Electroacoustic Music Festival
 1986 Leighton Colony Banff, Alberta, Centre for the Arts Fellowship
 1986 New York Foundation for the Arts Composer Fellowship
 1990, 1994 NYSCA Decentralization Grants for multimedia installations
 1996 Universiti Malaysia Sarawak Research Grant for Borneo media installation
 1996, 2000 Virgil Thompson Foundation (for CRI Recordings)
 1997: Asian Cultural Council (Residency with Asian Composers League in Manila, Philippines)
 2004 American Music Center Composer Award
 2010 NYFA Fellows/Innova Award for complete CD production
 2011 NYSCA Community Arts Grant for audio/video production of Peter's People, Creating the Dream

Discography

 Barton McLean, Orion Records ORS 75192, 1973
 American Contemporary—Electronic Music, Composers Recordings, Inc SD 335, 1975
 American Contemporary—David Burge and Lois Svard Burge, pianists, Composers Recordings, Inc 407, 1979
 American Society of University Composers, Advance FGR-25S (LP), 1979
 McLean: Electro-Symphonic Landscapes, Folkways Records (later Smithsonian) FTS 33450 (LP), 1979
 Electronic Music from the Outside In, Folkways Records (later Smithsonian) FPX 36050 (LP), 1980
 Music of a Timeless Earth. Folkways Records (later Smithsonian) FTS-33875 (LP), 1980
 American Contemporary—Extended Saxophone — Albert Regni, Composers Recordings, Inc 431, 1980
 Computer Music from the Outside In, Folkways Records (later Smithsonian) FSS-37465 (LP), 1983
 Electro-Surrealistic Landscapes, Opus One Records Stereo 96 (LP), 1986
 CDCM Computer Music Series Vol. 7, Centaur Records CRC 2047 (CD), 1990
 Rainforest Images, Capstone Records (Parma) CPS-8617 CD, 1993, re-released 2011
 Gods, Demons and the Earth, Capstone Records (Parma) CPS 8622-CD, 1995
 The McLean Mix & the Golden Age of Electronic Music. Composers Recordings Inc (New World) CD 764. 1997
 The Electric Performer, Capstone Records (Parma) CPS-8637 CD, 1997
 Forgotten Shadows, Composers Recordings, Inc (CRI) CRI 846, 2000
 McLean Mix Live!, MLC Publications (DVD), 2009
 The McLeans Mix Three—3 Collaborations, MLC Publications (DVD), 2009
 Barton & Priscilla McLean: Electronic Landscapes, EM Records, Japan, EM 1060 CD, 2009
 Soundworlds, Innova Recordings 234 (CD), 2010
 Peter's People—Creating the Dream, MLC Publications (DVD), 2011

Works

Selected works include:

Fantasia for Piano, 1968
Genesis, electronic, 1973
Spirals, electronic, 1974
Dimensions II for piano and recorded sound, 1974
Song of the Nahuatl, electronic, 1976
The Sorcerer Revisited, electronic, 1975, rev.1980
Dimensions III and IV for saxophone and recorded sound, 1979
A Lecture, speech improvisation featuring Trevor Wishart, with electronics, 1982
Etunytude, electronic, 1982
In Wilderness is the Preservation of the World for live performance, choir, narrators, soloists, taped wolves and eskimos, electronic sounds, audience singing, 1983
Pathways for symphonic winds and percussion, 1983
Rainforest, collaborative installation with Priscilla McLean for five performance stations, digital processing, recorded sound, and slides/video, 1989
Visions of a Summer Night electronic suite in 5 movements, 1989
Himalayan Fantasy, electronic, 1992
Rainforest Images I collaboration with Priscilla McLean, electronic, using rainforest sounds from 3 continents, 1993
Rainforest Images II, collaboration with Priscilla McLean and Hasnul Jamal Saidon, music and video, 1994
Earth Music, live electronics with 2 performers, 1993
Jambori Rimba, collaboration with Priscilla McLean for live performers and electronics, 1997
Happy Days for live electronics using music boxes, keyboards, flexatones, party instruments, acting,1997
Forgotten Shadows, electronic collage using many old time songs and instruments, 1998
Ritual of the Dawn for 6 piece chamber ensemble, 1998
Rainforest Reflections for orchestra, tape, two soloists, 1999
Rhapsody on a Desert Spring for MIDI violin, live performance with Korg Wavestation, 1999
Journey on a Long String, electronic, 2001
MILLing in the ENNIUM, electronic collage from installation of the same name, 2001
Magic at Xanadu, (MAX) live computer performance with MA/MSP, 2008
Concerto: States of Being for piano and electronics, 2009
Ice Canyons for live electronic performance with MAX/MSP, 2010
Jubilee for live computer performance with MAX/MSP, 2010
Peter's People Suite from video of the same name, 2012 
!metaSinfonica, electronic music produced with the Kyma system, with video enhancement, 2013
Dreamscapes electronic music produced with the Kyma system, with video enhancement, 2016
Night Conjurer electronic music produced with the Kyma system, with video enhancement, 2016
Saxy Dreams electronic and electroacoustic music produced with the Kyma system with video enhancement, 2017
Electrojuice a pulsative and jazzy creation using the Kyma system, with video, 2019
Discoveries (with selected Sounds & their VCS) with diagrams of some of the Kyma Sounds used, 2020
Discoveries (with Timeline) follow the music with a Kyma Timeline, 2020
Dusk in the Hollow music accompanied by evocative video images of historical Petersburgh, NY, 2020
Pterodactyl primeval music using Kyma and moving images of prehistoric birds, 2021
Illusions a Kyma-generated musical suite in 5 sections featuring fractal plus images of Stephen Dankner, 2021

New Grove Dictionary of Music and Musicians 2nd edition, Volume 15, title "McLean, Barton (Keith)", editors Stanley Sadie and John Tyrrell, author Barbara A. Petersen, publisher Macmillan Publishers, place London, year 2001, p. 508. 
New Directions in Music, 2nd edition, author David Cope, publisher W.C.Brown, place Dubuque, Iowa, year 1971, pp. 124–25. 
Artists and Activists, author Joseph Dalton, publisher The Troy Book Makers, place New York, year 2008, p. 71.
Electric Sound: The Past and Present of Electronic Music, author Joel Chadabe, publisher Prentice Hall, place Saddle River, New Jersey, year 1997, p. 331. 
Baker's Biographical Dictionary of Musicians 8th edition, title "McLean, Barton (Keith)", editor Nicolas Slonimsky, publisher Schirmer Books (Macmillan Publishers), place New York, year 1992, p. 1180.
Hanging off the Edge-Revelations of a Modern Troubadour, 2nd edition, author Priscilla McLean, publisher iUniverse, place Lincoln, Nebraska, year 2006. 
The Electronic Arts of Sound and Light, author Ronald Pellegrino, publisher Van Nostrand Reinhold, place New York, year 1983, p 26.

External links 
Barton and Priscilla McLean main site
Barton McLean *Older Site
New Music USA Library (Enter Barton McLean in search fields)
YouTube Playlist 
Innova Recordings page for B. McLean 
Capstone Records web link 
Cycling '74 web site for B McLean
WorldCat catalog for McLean's scores, CDs, digital files, videos

American male classical composers
American classical composers
20th-century classical composers
21st-century classical composers
American electronic musicians
Experimental composers
Electroacoustic music composers
Composers for piano
Musicians from Poughkeepsie, New York
People from Petersburgh, New York
21st-century American composers
1938 births
Living people
20th-century American composers
Classical musicians from New York (state)
20th-century American male musicians
21st-century American male musicians